Sigournais is a commune in the Vendée department in the Pays de la Loire region in western France.

Geography
The river Lay forms all of the commune's eastern border.

See also
Communes of the Vendée department
Sigourney (disambiguation)
[http://rickmansworthherts.com/webpage16.htm 	
L'Histoire de Famille de Sigournay]

References

Communes of Vendée